PRD may refer to:

Political parties
Democratic Renewal Party (Angola) (Partido Renovador Democrático)
Democratic Renewal Party (Benin) (Parti de Renouveau Démocratique)
Dominican Revolutionary Party (Partido Revolucionario Dominicano), a political party in the Dominican Republic
People's Democratic Party (Indonesia) (Partai Rakyat Demokratik)
Party of the Democratic Revolution (Partido de la Revolución Democrática), a political party in Mexico 
Democratic Revolutionary Party (Partido Revolucionario Democrático), a political party in Panama
Democratic Renewal Party (Portugal) (Partido Renovador Democrático), a former political party
Democratic Reformist Party (Partido Reformista Democrático), a former political party in Spain
Free Democratic Party of Switzerland (Parti radical-démocratique), a former political party

Science and technology
Partial rootzone drying, an irrigation technique
Physical Review D, a scientific journal
Poverty Related Diseases, an alternative term for diseases of poverty
Product requirements document in technology product development and planning

Other uses
Pearl River Delta, in south China
Presidential Review Directive, a kind of national security directive from the Bill Clinton presidency
 Fart in Czech language